The 1999 Indian general election in Haryana, occurred for 10 seats in the state.

List of Elected MPs

Indian general elections in Haryana
1990s in Haryana
1999 Indian general election